The 2016 China International Suzhou is a professional tennis tournament played on hard courts. It is the second edition of the tournament, which is part of the 2016 ATP Challenger Tour. It takes place in Suzhou, China from October 24 to October 30, 2016.

Singles main-draw entrants

Seeds 

 Rankings are as of October 17, 2016.

Other entrants 
The following players received wildcards into the singles main draw:
  Gao Xin
  Ouyang Bowen
  Te Rigele
  Xia Zihao

The following players received entry from the qualifying draw:
  Mikhail Elgin 
  Ying Nuqing
  Wang Ruikai
  Cao Zhaoyi

The following players entered as lucky losers:
  Qi Xi
  He Yecong

Champions

Singles 

  Yen-hsun Lu def.  Stefan Kozlov, 6–0, 6–1.

Doubles 

  Mikhail Elgin /  Alexander Kudryavtsev def.  Andrea Arnaboldi /  Jonathan Eysseric, 4–6, 6–1, [10–7].

China International Suzhou
2016 in Chinese sport